A List of Mexican films of the 1910s:

Mexican
1910s